Spasmolytic may refer to:
 Antispasmodic, smooth muscle relaxant
 A type of muscle relaxant
 "Spasmolytic" (song), by Canadian band Skinny Puppy